The 2020 Rio de Janeiro municipal election took place in the city of Rio de Janeiro, Brazil in November 2020 to elect a mayor, a vice mayor, and 51 city councillors for the administration of the city. On the 29 November 2020 run-off election, former mayor Eduardo Paes, of the Democrats (DEM), defeated incumbent mayor Marcelo Crivella of the Republicans (REP), who lost his bid for re-election.

Candidates

Candidates in runoff

Candidates failing to make runoff

Withdrawn candidates
 Alessandro Molon (PSB) - Federal Deputy from Rio de Janeiro since 2011; State Deputy of Rio de Janeiro 2003–2011. Candidate for Mayor of Rio de Janeiro in 2016.
 Arolde de Oliveira (PSD) - Senator from Rio de Janeiro since 2019; Federal Deputy from Rio de Janeiro 1984-2019.
 Bruno Kazuhiro (DEM) - National President of the Democrats' Youth since 2014.
 Cabo Daciolo (PL) - Federal Deputy from Rio de Janeiro 2015−2019. Candidate for President of Brazil in 2018.
 Carlo Caiado (DEM) - City Councillor of Rio de Janeiro 2013-2019; State Deputy of Rio de Janeiro since 2019.
 Hélio Lopes (PSL) - Federal Deputy from Rio de Janeiro since 2019.
 Hugo Leal (PSD) - Federal Deputy for Rio de Janeiro 2007–present; State Deputy of Rio de Janeiro 1999-2006.
 Luiz Paulo Corrêa da Silva (PSDB) - State Deputy of Rio de Janeiro since 2003; Vice Governor of Rio de Janeiro 1995–1999.
 Marcelo Calero (CDN) - Federal Deputy from Rio de Janeiro since 2019; Minister of Culture 2016.
 Marcelo Freixo (PSOL) - Federal Deputy from Rio de Janeiro since 2019; State Deputy of Rio de Janeiro 2007–2019.
 Mariana Ribas (PSDB) - Municipal Secretary of Culture of Rio de Janeiro; Director of Ancine 2018−2019.
 Otoni de Paula (PSC) - Federal Deputy from Rio de Janeiro since 2019; City Councillor of Rio de Janeiro 2017-2019.
 Paulo Marinho (PSDB) - Businessman.
 Paulo Rabello de Castro (PSC) - Former president of BNDES 2017-2018; former president of IBGE 2016-2017.
 Pedro Fernandes Neto (PSC) - State Secretary of Education of Rio de Janeiro since 2019; State Deputy of Rio de Janeiro 2007–2019; Municipal Secretary of Social Assistance and Human Rights of Rio de Janeiro 2017–2018; State Secretary of Science, Technology, Innovation and Social Development of Rio de Janeiro 2017; State Secretary of Social Assistance and Human Rights of Rio de Janeiro 2014, 2017; Municipal Secretary of the Environment of Rio de Janeiro 2008.
 Rodrigo Amorim (PSL - State Deputy of Rio de Janeiro since 2019.
 Indio da Costa (Independent) - Federal Deputy from Rio de Janeiro 2007–2011, 2015–2019; Municipal Secretary of Urbanism, Infrastructure and Housing of Rio de Janeiro 2017–2018; Municipal Secretary of Administration of Rio de Janeiro 2001–2006; City Councillor of Rio de Janeiro 1997–2006.

Opinion polls

First round

Published after the campaign's start

Published before the campaign's start

Second round

Debates

Municipal Chamber
The result of the last municipal election and the current situation in the Municipal Chamber is given below:

Results

Mayor

Municipal Chamber

Notes

References

Mayoral elections in Brazil
Rio de Janiero mayoral
Politics of Rio de Janeiro (city)
November 2020 events in Brazil
2020s in Rio de Janeiro
Elections postponed due to the COVID-19 pandemic